Akashe ki Ranga Lagila is a 2009 India Odia-language film directed by S.K. Muralidharan. It stars Anubhav Mohanty, Archita Sahu and Rali Nanda. Mohanty received the Best Actor award at the Odisha State Film Awards. The film won the 2009 Odisha State Film Award for Best Screenplay, Best Editor and Best Art Direction. The film was produced by Sitaram Agrwal under Sarthak Music. It is a remake of the 2008 Tamil film Mahesh, Saranya Matrum Palar. It was a blockbuster Odia movie of 2009, ran for 100 days in theatres.

References

External links

2009 films
Cinema of Odisha
2000s Odia-language films
Odia remakes of Tamil films